The New Guinea scaly-toed gecko (Lepidodactylus novaeguineae) is a species of gecko. It is endemic to New Guinea.

References

Lepidodactylus
Reptiles described in 1977
Endemic fauna of New Guinea